Edogawa may refer to:
Edogawa, Tokyo
Edo River

People with the surname
 Edogawa Ranpo (1894–1965), Japanese author
 Conan Edogawa, a character in Case Closed
 Keishi Edogawa, a pen name of author Takashi Nagasaki

Japanese-language surnames